Torleif Torkildsen (12 May 1892 – 14 October 1944) was a Norwegian gymnast and tennis player who competed in the 1912 Summer Olympics. He was part of the Norwegian gymnastics team, which won the bronze medal in the gymnastics men's team, Swedish system event.

In tennis he was a member of the Norway Davis Cup team, in which he granted Norway's first victorious rubber in the tie against Hungary in 1929 by beating Imre Takáts. Prior to entering the Davis Cup in 1927 Norway competed in the Nordisk Cup, an annual four-nation Scandinavian tennis team cup, in which he granted Norway's only won match against Sweden's Curt Östberg. The same year in August he won an international tournament in Oslo meeting Östberg again in the final. In national competition he was a five-time tennis champion between 1926 and 1930.

References

External links
profile

1892 births
1944 deaths
Norwegian male artistic gymnasts
Norwegian male tennis players
Gymnasts at the 1912 Summer Olympics
Olympic gymnasts of Norway
Olympic bronze medalists for Norway
Olympic medalists in gymnastics
Medalists at the 1912 Summer Olympics
20th-century Norwegian people